Yalçın Ayhan (born 1 May 1982) is a Turkish former professional footballer who played as a centre back.

International
In November 2016 Ayhan received his first call-up to the senior Turkey squad for the match against Kosovo.

References

External links
 Guardian Stats Centre 
 
 
 
 

1982 births
Living people
Footballers from Istanbul
Turkish footballers
Turkey B international footballers
Galatasaray S.K. footballers
Kayseri Erciyesspor footballers
Sakaryaspor footballers
Manisaspor footballers
Antalyaspor footballers
İstanbulspor footballers
Gaziantepspor footballers
Orduspor footballers
Kasımpaşa S.K. footballers
İstanbul Başakşehir F.K. players
Ankaraspor footballers
Yeni Malatyaspor footballers
MKE Ankaragücü footballers
Fatih Karagümrük S.K. footballers
Süper Lig players
TFF First League players
Association football defenders